Darien Evans, better known by his stage name, Darien Sills-Evans, is an American actor, writer, comedian, and director. He is best known for Darien in Cosby (1998-2000), CSU Tech Foster in Third Watch (2002-2005) and Andrew in The Reception (2005).

Television career
Early in his career, Evans was best known for his television career including playing "Darien" on 17 episodes of the CBS sitcom Cosby from 1998 until 2000, and as “Dr. Fields” on the NBC drama Third Watch in 22 episodes from 2002 until 2005. Other guest appearances include Law & Order, New York Undercover, Law & Order: Special Victims Unit, The Black Donnellys, and Person of Interest. More recently, he played "Darnell Nichols" on 8 episodes of Treme between 2011 and 2013.

Since at least 2011, Evans has been the national spokesperson for U.S. Cellular.

Cinema career

Sills-Evans wrote, directed and starred in the 2002 film X-Patriots, a romantic comedy about two black American men who travel to the Netherlands – a place where no one looks like them – in search of self-identity. Dutch media personality Chimène van Oosterhout was part of the cast in this movie. X-Patriots was named Best Feature Drama and a Critic's Choice at the Angelciti Film Festival in Chicago, and an official selection at the Boston Film Festival, the Newark Black Film Festival and the Sidewalk Film Festival. He financed the film with money he earned from his appearances on Cosby.

In 2005, Sills-Evans was associate producer and starred in The Reception directed by John G. Young which had its world premiere at the Tribeca Film Festival. The film subsequently played at numerous festivals in the U.S., including Outfest in Los Angeles, where Sills-Evans earned a best actor award.

In 2009, co-wrote and produced the feature film Rivers Wash Over Me directed by John G. Young (of The Reception). The film became the centerpiece movie of the 2009 NewFest Festival. At the 2009 Outfest in Los Angeles, the leading role actor Derrick L. Middleton in the movie won the Grand Jury Award for "Outstanding Actor in a Feature Film". Darien Sills-Evans also appears in the film in the role of Charles King.

In 2010, Sills-Evans directed the short film, "Dream House", written and produced by Caytha Jentis.

In 2010, Sills-Evans wrote and directed six episodes of "MC Extra Cheese: The 40-Year-Old Rapper" for American Cheesehole Productions. The pilot was nominated for Best Pilot at the 2012 Bannf World Media Festival.

In addition to his entertainment work, Sills-Evans has worked in the industrial video field directing and producing educational titles like I Don't Have A Problem: The Path To Addiction and Student Workshop: Building Character.

Comedy

Sills-Evans has appeared in comedy venues across the United States. In 2010 he founded Tipsy Hustle, a comedy show and open mic that continues at The Five Spot Soul Food Restaurant in Brooklyn, New York and at The Improv Space in Los Angeles.

In 2014, Sills-Evans began production on RaceMan, a weekly podcast that features comedians - usually persons of color - discussing newsworthy events and pop culture.

Filmography and awards

Director
2002: X-Patriots

Producer
2005: The Reception - Associate producer
2009: Rivers Wash Over Me - Producer

Actor

References

External links
 
 

Living people
American male film actors
American male television actors
Year of birth missing (living people)